is a Japanese PC game released in 1993. It was adapted to a 3-episode OVA released between 1996 and 1997. The OVAs were initially licensed by Media Blasters. It is currently licensed by Sentai Filmworks.

Plot
Once upon a month, a door behind the full moon opens. This door is between the human world and magical world. Now it just so happens that on one such night, Lime and Bass are in hot pursuit of a demon who had stolen six power gems from the magical world. The demon escapes to the human world through the open door, and the two follow. Now they must search for the six power gems, all of which have been scattered all over Tokyo. It's up to Lime and Bass to blend into with humans and find the gems.

Characters
 Lime
 
 A demon girl with wings, who can transform into various female disguises.
 Bass

 A demon who can transform into a monster. He is perverted, which makes Lime angry and beat him up.
 Doc
 
 A big, burly female doctor who appears in the third episode.
 Mizuki Seo
 
 A normal human girl. She becomes Lime's friend when she comes to attend school. She is clueless to Lime and Bass's mission.
 Mr. Candle
 
 A monster taking on the form of a candle. He can use his wax to freeze people. he is angry at the humans because of their use of electricity.
 Mr. Purse
 
 A monster taking on the form of a coin purse. Unlike the other two, he is kind and not good at being a monster. He came to existence, due to the wide use of credit cards instead of cash.
 Mr. C. Ringe
 
 A monster taking on the form of a needle. The most vengeful of the monsters, angry at the humans because of their fear of needles.

See also
 List of anime aired on TBS

References

External links
 

1997 anime OVAs
Adventure games
Anime Works
Ashi Productions
FM Towns games
NEC PC-9801 games
PlayStation (console) games
Sega Saturn games
Sentai Filmworks
X68000 games